Bolsa de Valores de Moçambique or Maputo Stock Exchange  is the first stock exchange in Mozambique. It was opened in 1999, with the support of the Lisbon Stock Exchange and the World Bank.

References

External links
Mozambique Stock Exchange Official Website
Maputo Stock Exchange
Mozambique
Development Policy for Small Stock Markets: A Case Study of Mozambique and Swaziland

Stock exchanges in Africa